Statistics of Primera Fuerza in season 1938-39:

Overview
It was contested by 7 teams, and Asturias won the championship.

League standings

Moves
After this season Euzkadi was broken up, with most of its players joining other teams in the league, except two who joined teams in Argentina.

Top goalscorers
Players sorted first by goals scored, then by last name.

References

1938-39
Mex
1938–39 in Mexican football